Social TV (STV) was a 24-hour mainstream digital television channel in the Philippines. It features social media contents and creations such as Do It Yourself (DIY) videos, short films, educational vlogs, documentaries, animation, tutorial, hobbies, music, entertainment and technology trends. It allows its viewers to interact with the TV network and let amateur content producers to share their own content not only on social media but also on free-to-air television.

It was a subchannel of UNTV News and Rescue, the network's carrier on free-to-air digital terrestrial television (DTT). It broadcasts 24 hours a day on Ultra High Frequency (UHF) Channel 38 (617.143 MHz) in Metro Manila, Rizal, Bulacan, Pampanga, Laguna, Cavite and some parts of Tarlac. Its studios in the Philippines are located at the La Verdad Christian College Building, Bagong Barrio, EDSA, Caloocan. Its digital transmitter is located at Emerald Hills, Sumulong Highway in Antipolo, Rizal.

STV was known for its broadcast of behind-the-scenes of UNTV's morning show "Good Morning Kuya" led by broadcast journalist and UNTV-BMPI CEO Daniel Razon. STV claims to be the first and only social mainstream media channel in the Philippines.

Digitalization 

UNTV began its digital terrestrial television test broadcast in the last quarter of 2014. UNTV operator BMPI started testing Japan's Integrated Service Digital Broadcasting-Terrestrial (ISDB-T), the sole digital television (DTV) standard in the Philippines for its transition from analog to digital broadcast, on UHF Channel 38 as its frequency.

The network initially activated four subchannels on digital television. UNTV-1, UNTV-2 and UNTV 1-SEG air the same program while ADDTV showcased MCGI praise music videos primarily from A Song of Praise (ASOP) Music Festival. In September 2017, UNTV-BMPI CEO Daniel Razon held an exclusive ceremonial switch-on of Truth Channel during international thanksgiving gathering of the MCGI in Apalit, Pampanga, replacing ADDTV.

On January 15, 2018, BMPI replaced UNTV-2 with Social TV and later on upgraded its broadcast quality from standard definition to high definition format. In 2020, it was discontinued and replaced by the UNTV's main channel feed at 1080p resolution; however, it airs "Ito Ang Iyong Lingkod: Don Manolo" on this channel, thus breaking away from the main feed from 11 am to 12:30 pm during weekdays.

Programs

Currently aired show 
Ito Ang Inyong Lingkod: Don Manolo

Final Programs aired as STV 
Aghamazing
Hobbies & Passion
 Minienarts
 Crafty Hackers
 Buhay Nanay
 Flickula
 Foods For Foodies
 Erica Shares
 How To Do It
 Music & Entertainment
 Nognog In The City: The Feed
 Girl Stuff

Hosts

Final Hosts 
Janelle Rose Navalta
 Rodel Flordeliz
 Erica Marisse Honrado
 Kerwin Lawrence Octavo

Stations

TV stations

Digital

See also
 Ang Dating Daan
 Truth Channel
 Members Church of God International
 UNTV

References

External links

Members Church of God International
Progressive Broadcasting Corporation
Television stations in Metro Manila
Defunct television networks in the Philippines
Television channels and stations established in 2018
Digital television stations in the Philippines